The simple station Carrera 43 is part of the TransMilenio mass-transit system of Bogotá, Colombia, which opened in the year 2000.

Location

The station is located in Bogotá's industrial zone, specifically on Calle 13 between Carreras 41 and 42A Bis.

History

The station was opened in 2003 after completion of the Calle 13 portion of the Américas line, from De La Sabana to Puente Aranda.

Station services

Old trunk services

Main line service

Feeder routes

This station does not have connections to feeder routes.

Inter-city service

This station does not have inter-city service.

External links
TransMilenio

See also
Bogotá
TransMilenio
List of TransMilenio Stations

TransMilenio